A list of the windmills in Portugal.

Azores

Cape Verde

Madeira

Portugal

References

Portugal
Wind